The Consensus 1989 College Basketball All-American team, as determined by aggregating the results of four major All-American teams.  To earn "consensus" status, a player must win honors from a majority of the following teams: the Associated Press, the USBWA, The United Press International and the National Association of Basketball Coaches.

1989 Consensus All-America team

Individual All-America teams

AP Honorable Mention:

Nick Anderson, Illinois
B. J. Armstrong, Iowa
Stacey Augmon, UNLV
Dana Barros, Boston College
Kenny Battle, Illinois
Ricky Blanton, LSU
Chucky Brown, NC State
Jay Burson, Ohio State
Derrick Coleman, Syracuse
Bimbo Coles, Virginia Tech
Anthony Cook, Arizona
Kendall Gill, Illinois
Gerald Glass, Ole Miss
Scott Haffner, Evansville
Tom Hammonds, Georgia Tech
Tim Hardaway, UTEP
Steve Henson, Kansas State
Tyrone Hill, Xavier
Joe Hillman, Indiana
Ed Horton, Iowa
Byron Irvin, Missouri
Danny Jones, Wisconsin
Jeff Lebo, North Carolina
Kurk Lee, Towson State
Don MacLean, UCLA
Mark Macon, Temple
Roy Marble, Iowa
Jeff Martin, Murray State
Eric McLaughlin, Akron
Rodney Monroe, NC State
John Morton, Seton Hall
Dyron Nix, Tennessee
Gary Payton, Oregon State
Elliot Perry, Memphis State
Ramón Ramos, Seton Hall
J. R. Reid, North Carolina
Rumeal Robinson, Michigan
Kenny Sanders, George Mason
Dwayne Schintzius, Florida
Brian Shorter, Pittsburgh
Michael Smith, BYU
John Taft, Marshall
Stephen Thompson, Syracuse
Loy Vaught, Michigan
Randy White, Louisiana Tech

References

NCAA Men's Basketball All-Americans
All-Americans